is a passenger railway station in the city of Kashiwa, Chiba, Japan, operated by East Japan Railway Company (JR East).

Lines

Station layout
The station consists of a single island platform serving two tracks, with an elevated station building. The station is staffed.

Platforms

History
Kita-Kashiwa Station was opened on April 10, 1970 as a freight station on the Japan National Railways (JNR). The station opened for passenger traffic on April 20, 1972. Kita-Kashiwa Station was absorbed into the JR East network upon the privatization of the JNR on April 1, 1987.

Passenger statistics
In fiscal 2019, the station was used by an average of 19,140 passengers daily.

Surrounding area
 
 Kashiwa Chamber of Commerce
 Chiba Prefectural Kashiwa High School
 Jikei University Medical University Kashiwa Hospital

See also
 List of railway stations in Japan

References

External links

   JR East Station information 

Railway stations in Chiba Prefecture
Railway stations in Japan opened in 1970
Jōban Line
Kashiwa